The Bangalore Club, located in Bangalore, Karnataka, is the oldest club in the city. Founded in 1868, it counts among its previous members the Maharajah of Mysore and Winston Churchill. A ledger on display in the main building of the club is open to a page that has a list of "irrecoverable debts" that were written off by the club. One of these is the sum Rs.13, owed by Winston Churchill.

Membership at present for the category of new permanent members is closed, but last when open, had a waiting list of over 30 years.

History 
The club was established in 1868, named the Bangalore United Services Club for officers of the British Empire. In 1915, membership was opened to Indian officers. 

Membership for civilians was opened in 1946, and the club was renamed the Bangalore Club.

Facilities 
The club has limited number of restaurants, bars, libraries and sports facilities i.e.: Badminton, Squash, Billiards, Table Tennis, Swimming Pools, Tennis courts, Bridge, Gymnasium etc., and is built in the colonial style. In addition to these, it also has a number of stores for the convenience of its members, open to only club members.

The club has many rules and regulations which could be more of an effect of a colonial hangover, but lately there has been a concentrated effort to rectify the same. 

Members are also able to visit other affiliated clubs around India, as well as many parts of the world.

The Club has tough dress regulations at several places which upholds the tradition of the club at all times

See also 
 List of India's gentlemen's clubs

References

External links

Culture of Bangalore
1868 establishments in India
Clubs and societies in India
Organisations based in Bangalore